The Galápagos land iguana (Conolophus subcristatus) is a very large species of lizard in the family Iguanidae. It is one of three species of the genus Conolophus. It is endemic to the Galápagos Islands, in the dry lowlands of the islands of Fernandina, Isabela, Santa Cruz, North Seymour, Baltra, and South Plaza.

Taxonomy
The land iguanas in the Galápagos vary in morphology and coloration among different populations. In addition to the relatively widespread and well-known Galápagos land iguana (C. subcristatus), there are two other species of Conolophus: the Galápagos pink land iguana (C. marthae) from northern Isabela Island and the Santa Fe land iguana (C. pallidus) from Santa Fe Island. Based on mtDNA, land iguanas and marine iguanas diverged about 8–10 million years ago. Within the land iguana genus, the oldest split based on mtDNA, about 5.7 million years old, is between C. subcristatus and C. marthae. A more recent study that included both mtDNA and nuclear DNA indicates that the marine iguana split from the land iguana about 4.5 million years ago, and among the land iguanas C. subcristatus and C. marthae split from each other about 1.5 million years ago. The differentiation between the last two species, C. subcristatus and C. pallidus, is less clear and it has been questioned whether they are separate species. Based on mtDNA and cytochrome b, they fall into three monophyletic groups: C. subcristatus of  western islands (Isabela and Fernandina), C. subcristatus of central islands (Santa Cruz, Baltra and South Plaza) and C. pallidus. Although the exact pattern is uncertain, it is possible that C. pallidus is closer to one of the C. subcristatus groups than the two C. subcristatus groups are to each other.

Its specific name subcristatus is derived from the Latin words sub meaning "lesser" and cristatus meaning "crested", and refers to the low crest of spines along the animal's back, which is not as tall as in most iguanas.

Anatomy and morphology
Charles Darwin described the Galápagos land iguana as "ugly animals, of a yellowish orange beneath, and of a brownish-red colour above: from their low facial angle they have a singularly stupid appearance." Being cold-blooded, they absorb heat from the sun by basking on volcanic rock, and at night sleep in burrows to conserve their body heat. These iguanas also enjoy a symbiotic relationship with birds; the birds remove parasites and ticks, providing relief to the iguanas and food for the birds.

Diet and longevity

Land iguanas are primarily herbivorous; however, some individuals have shown that they are opportunistic carnivores supplementing their diet with insects, centipedes and carrion. Because fresh water is scarce on its island habitats, the Galápagos land iguana obtains the majority of its moisture from the prickly-pear cactus, which makes up 80% of its diet. All parts of the plant are consumed, including the fruit, flowers, pads, and even spines. During the rainy season it will drink from available standing pools of water and feast on yellow flowers of the genus Portulaca.

The Galápagos land iguana has a 60 to 69 year lifespan.

Reproduction

Galápagos land iguanas become sexually mature anywhere between eight and fifteen years of age, depending on which island they are from. The eggs hatch anywhere from 90 to 125 days later.

On South Plaza Island, where the territories of marine iguanas and land iguanas overlap, the two sometimes interbreed, resulting in a hybrid iguana that shows a mixture of features from each species. The most likely unions tend to be between male marine iguanas and female land iguanas. Despite their long separation time and their being two distinct species from different genera, the offspring are viable, although likely sterile.

Population
It is estimated that between 5,000 and 10,000 land iguanas are found in the Galápagos Islands. These iguanas were so abundant on Santiago Island at one time that naturalist Charles Darwin remarked when it was called King James Island that "...when we were left at James, we could not for some time find a spot free from their burrows on which to pitch our single tent". In the years since then, entire populations (including all the animals on Santiago Island) have been wiped out by introduced feral animals such as pigs, rats, cats, and dogs.

Evolutionary history
Researchers theorize that Galápagos land iguanas and marine iguanas evolved from a common ancestor since arriving on the islands from South America, presumably by rafting. The marine iguana diverged from the land iguana some 8 million years ago, which is older than any of the extant Galápagos islands. It is therefore thought that the ancestral species inhabited parts of the volcanic archipelago that are now submerged. The two species remain mutually fertile in spite of being assigned to distinct genera, and they occasionally hybridize where their ranges overlap.

Recovery efforts

Beginning in the early 1990s, the Galápagos land iguana has been the subject of an active reintroduction campaign on Baltra Island.  These animals became extinct on Baltra by 1954, allegedly wiped out by soldiers stationed there who shot the iguanas for amusement. However, in the early 1930s, William Randolph Hearst had translocated a population of land iguanas from Baltra to North Seymour Island, a smaller island just a few hundred metres north of Baltra, because he could not understand why no iguanas were present there. Hearst's translocated iguanas survived and became the breeding stock for the Charles Darwin Research Station captive breeding program that has successfully reintroduced the species to Baltra and a number of other areas. Visitors today frequently see iguanas on both the runway of the Baltra airport or while they cross the road.

References

External links

Galápagos Conservation Trust
galapagosonline.com
PBS:Destination Galápagos Islands
Conolophus subcristatus at Animal Diversity Web
Galápagos Land Iguana feeding on a cactus – video clip

Conolophus
Endemic reptiles of the Galápagos Islands
Reptiles described in 1831
Taxa named by John Edward Gray
Taxonomy articles created by Polbot